The 2015–16 UCF Knights men's basketball team represented the University of Central Florida during the 2015–16 NCAA Division I men's basketball season. The Knights were member of the American Athletic Conference. The Knights, in the program's 47th season of basketball, were led by sixth year head coach Donnie Jones and played their home games at the CFE Arena on the university's main campus in Orlando, Florida. They finished the season with a record of 12–18, 6–12 in AAC play to finish in seventh place in conference. They lost in the first round of the AAC tournament to Tulane. After the season, Donnie Jones was fired as UCF's head coach.

Previous season
The Knights finished the 2014–15 season with a record of 12–18, 5–13 in AAC play to finish in ninth place in conference. They lost in the first round of the AAC tournament to East Carolina.

Departures

Incoming Transfers

Incoming recruits

Roster

Schedule and results

|-
!colspan=9 style="background:#000000; color:#BC9B6A;"| Non-conference regular season

|-
!colspan=9 style="background:#000000; color:#BC9B6A;"| American Regular Season

|-
!colspan=9 style="background:#000000; color:#BC9B6A;"| 2016 American Athletic Conference tournament

References

UCF Knights men's basketball seasons
UCF
UCF Knights
UCF Knights